In enzymology, a tRNA-pseudouridine synthase I is an enzyme that catalyzes the chemical reaction

tRNA uridine  tRNA pseudouridine

Hence, this enzyme has one substrate, tRNA uridine, and one product, tRNA pseudouridine.

This enzyme belongs to the family of isomerases, specifically those intramolecular transferases transferring other groups.  The systematic name of this enzyme class is tRNA-uridine uracilmutase. Other names in common use include tRNA-uridine isomerase, tRNA pseudouridylate synthase I, transfer ribonucleate pseudouridine synthetase, pseudouridine synthase, and transfer RNA pseudouridine synthetase.

Structural studies

References

 
 

EC 5.4.99
Enzymes of known structure